Françoise "Adine" Masson was a French tennis player at the end of the 19th century and beginning of the 20th century. The daughter of Armand Masson, the founder of the Tennis Club de Paris, in 1897 she became the first winner of the French Tennis Championship beating Suzanne Girod in two sets. She also won the championship in 1898 and 1899 because there was no opposition and in 1902 and 1903 against Girod and Kate Gillou respectively. In 1907 she won the inaugural French doubles championships partnering Yvonne de Pfeffel.

In 1904 she again reached the final but was beaten by Kate Gillou.

References

External links
 French Open – Past Women's Singles Champions

French female tennis players
French Championships (tennis) champions
Year of death missing
Year of birth missing